Frank Fox (1911 – 29 June 1940) was an Irish Gaelic footballer and athlete. His championship career with the Galway senior team lasted five seasons from 1933 until 1937.

Fox first played competitive Gaelic football with the Dunmore McHales club. He later joined the Galway Gaels club before ending his career with Dunmore McHales.

Fox made his debut on the inter-county scene when he was selected for the Galway junior team. He enjoyed one championship season with the junior team, culminating with the winning of an All-Ireland medal in 1931. He subsequently joined the Galway senior team and made his debut during the 1933 championship. Over the course of the next few seasons Fox won one All-Ireland medal as well as back-to-back Connacht medals.

After being selected for the Connacht inter-provincial team for the first time in 1934, Fox was a regular choice on the starting fifteen for the following few seasons. During that time he won two Railway Cup medals.

The trophy for the Galway Senior Football Championship is named in his honor.  Presented to Galway in 1951 by Frank's brother Tom who lived in America.  The Army side based in Renmore were the first team to lift the Frank Fox Cup.

Honours

Galway
All-Ireland Senior Football Championship (1): 1934
Connacht Senior Football Championship (2): 1933, 1934
All-Ireland Junior Football Championship (1): 1931
Connacht Junior Football Championship (1): 1931

Connacht
Railway Cup (2): 1934, 1936

References

1911 births
1940 deaths
Dunmore McHales Gaelic footballers
Galway inter-county Gaelic footballers
Connacht inter-provincial Gaelic footballers